A polarized membrane is a lipid membrane that has a positive electrical charge on one side and a negative charge on another side, which produces the resting potential in living cells. Whether or not a membrane is polarized is determined by the distribution of dissociable protons and permeant ions inside and outside the membrane that travel passively through ion channel or actively via ion pump, creating an action potential.

See also
Membrane transporter

References

Membrane biology
Electrophysiology